The men's event of the FIBT World Championships 2015 was held on 5–6 March 2015.

Results
The first two runs were started on 5 March at 10:00, and the last two runs on 6 March at 14:30.

References

Men